Tudhoe is a village in County Durham, in England. It lies just outside Spennymoor, a short distance to the west of the Great North Road. The village is now a quiet backwater, its green a cul-de-sac that runs down from the main road towards the River Wear. In former times, however, Tudhoe lay at the centre of a network of roads: one ran to Durham by way of Sunderland Bridge and Croxdale, another to Kirk Merrington, a third to Bishop Auckland, a fourth to Whitworth and Byers Green, and a fifth across a ford to Brancepeth Castle and village on the far side of the river. All except the Brancepeth road are shown, somewhat schematically, on Thomas Jeffrey's map of County Durham of 1758.

Tudhoe is now dwarfed by Spennymoor, an industrial town that grew up around the Tudhoe iron works in the 19th century. The modern town of Spennymoor lies only a few fields from Tudhoe, but the contours are such that it cannot be seen from most of the village, and Tudhoe today gives the impression that it is still an isolated country village.

For most of its history, Tudhoe has been in the parish of Brancepeth. The parish church of St Brandon's, dating from the 16th century, was one of the finest village churches in County Durham until its destruction by fire in 1998. Brancepeth lies across the River Wear from Tudhoe; there has never been a bridge, and the ford was not an easy one. In winter, it was often impassable, and Tudhoe baptisms, weddings and burials then took place at Whitworth. Because of this, Tudhoe was always seen (from Brancepeth) as an isolated outpost. Tudhoe's own Anglican churches, Holy Innocents and St David's, were not built until 1866 and 1880, respectively, though there is a large Catholic church, dedicated to St. Charles Borromeo, which was founded in 1858.

Tudhoe was renowned as a mining village until the end of the 20th century. Until the closure of the mines, the wealthy Colliery Masters took up residence in a grand mansion known as The Loggins, which stands in several acres of its own land and overlooks the area.

Tudhoe United FC are the local football team and play in Spennymoor Sunday League.

References

External links

 Village history
 Picture Spennymoor (including Tudhoe)
 Tudhoe Cricket Club

Villages in County Durham
Spennymoor